Marin Draganja and Henri Kontinen were the defending champions, but they played in Monte Carlo instead. Facundo Argüello and Facundo Bagnis won the title, defeating Chung Hyeon and Divij Sharan 3–6, 6–2, [13–11] in the final.

Seeds

Draw

References
 Main Draw

Sarasota Open - Doubles